Lenta is a comune (municipality) in the Province of Vercelli in the Italian region Piedmont, located about  northeast of Turin and about  north of Vercelli.

Lenta borders the following municipalities: Carpignano Sesia, Gattinara, Ghemme, Ghislarengo, and Rovasenda. In its territory is a site housing some 3,000 retired military vehicles of the Italian Army.

References

Cities and towns in Piedmont